Alexander Saltykov can refer to one of the following:
Alexander Saltykov (1865–192?) – Member of the State Council and last Governor of Tambov.
Alexander Saltykov (1941–) – Archpriest and Dean of Saint Tikhon's Orthodox University
Alexander Saltykov (1728–1775) – Russian writer and translator, first Conference Secretary of Imperial Academy of Arts
Alexander Saltykov (1775–1837) – Prince, and son of N. I. Saltykov

See also
Saltykov, a Russian masculine surname